Flóres saga ok Blankiflúr is a medieval Icelandic romance saga.

Characteristics 

The saga is a prose translation of the medieval French romance Floire et Blancheflor produced in Norway in the thirteenth century. In 1312 it became the basis of one of the Swedish verse romances known after their patron as the Eufemiavisorna: Flores och Blanzeflor.

Manuscripts 

Kalinke and Mitchell identified the following manuscripts of the saga:

 AM 489, 4° (ca. 1450), vellum
 AM 575a, 4° (15th c.), vellum
 AM 930, 4° (ca. 1800)
 AM 948d, 4° (19th c.)
 IB 185, 8° (ca. 1770)
 IB 203, 8° (1857-59)
 IB 228, 4° (ca. 1750)
 Jón Ôfeigsson, Hafnarnes, Hornafjörður, MS. XI (1854)
 JS 627, 4° (17th-19th c.)
 JS 632, 4° (17th-19th c.)
 JS 641, 4° (17th- 19th c.)
 JS 636, 4° (17th-19th c.)
 Karl Jonsson, Purkey, MS. 5, 4° (1872)
 Lbs 1365, 8° (1823)
 Lbs 1493, 4° (1880-1905)
 Lbs 2316, 4° (ca. 1850)
 Lbs 3162, 4° (ca. 1900)
 Lbs 423, fol. (18th c.)
 Lbs 4660, 4° (1841)
 Lbs 4825, 4° (18th c.)
 Lbs 998, 4° (19th c.)
 National Archives, Oslo: NRA 65 (14th c.), vellum
 National Museum, Reykjavík, Ásbúðarsafn: Sogubok (1795)
 Nikulas Ottenson Collection, Johns Hopkins University, Baltimore, Md.: MS. Nr 1 (late 18th c.)
 NKS 1745, 4° (late 18th c.)
 Rask 32 (late 18th c.)
 University Library, Lund: LUB 14, 4° (mid-18th c.)
 NKS 1144, fol. (18th c.)

Editions and translations 

 Flóres saga ok Blankiflúr, ed. by Eugen Kölbing, Altnordische Saga-Bibliothek, 5 (Halle a.S.: Niemeyer, 1896) (the principal scholarly edition).
 Riddarasögur, ed. by Bjarni Vilhjálmsson, 6 vols (Reykjavík: Íslendingasagnaútgáfan, 1949-1951), IV 137-94 (modernised text, based on Kölbing).

References 

Chivalric sagas
Icelandic literature
Old Norse literature